The Parque José “Pepito” Bonano is located in Guaynabo, Puerto Rico and is a sports facility used mainly for baseball, and soccer.  It is used by Puerto Rico Soccer League's Guaynabo Fluminense FC for its soccer games.

References

Baseball venues in Puerto Rico
Buildings and structures in Guaynabo, Puerto Rico
Multi-purpose stadiums in the United States
Football venues in Puerto Rico